Kenneth Choi (born October 20, 1971) is an American actor. He is known for playing Henry Lin on the television series Sons of Anarchy (2008–2014), Chester Ming in Martin Scorsese's The Wolf of Wall Street (2013), and Judge Lance Ito in The People v. O. J. Simpson: American Crime Story (2016). He is also known for his roles as Jim Morita and Principal Morita in the Marvel Cinematic Universe films Captain America: The First Avenger (2011) and Spider-Man: Homecoming (2017) respectively, and Lewis on the Fox comedy series The Last Man on Earth (2016–2017). Since 2018 he is starring in the Fox drama series 9-1-1, playing LAFD firefighter Howie "Chimney" Han.

Early life

Choi was born in Chicago, Illinois, to Korean immigrants. His father worked as an electrical engineering professor and businessman. His mother was a registered nurse before becoming a stay-at-home mother. Choi is the middle of three children. He attended Longwood Elementary in Glenwood, Illinois. He attended intermediate and junior high school at Brookwood School District 167. Choi performed as a break dancer during his junior high years. He ran cross-country and was a gymnast at Homewood-Flossmoor High School where he held the sophomore record for the pommel horse. His parents, especially his father, discouraged his childhood dreams of becoming an actor, instructing him to pursue a "responsible and reasonable" career, like accounting. Choi followed the advice of his parents and majored in accounting at Purdue University, but decided to drop out in order to pursue his acting dreams. Choi stated: "I came from a very traditional Asian upbringing so they were very strict. When I decided to pursue acting, I knew that I had to do it all on my own. When I left the Midwest, I cut all ties with my family. I basically ran away from home."

Choi moved to Portland, Oregon to pursue a career in acting. He had no prior work experience so he gained employment at a local Blockbuster video store. He spent the next five years training with local Portland acting teachers, most notably with Paul Warner.

Acting career
Choi began his acting career in Portland, Oregon. His first role was in the Disney Channel television film, Halloweentown, with Debbie Reynolds. Choi moved to Los Angeles in late 1999 to further pursue a career as an actor. In film, Choi appeared in The Wolf of Wall Street (as Chester Ming), Captain America: The First Avenger (as Jim Morita), Red Dawn (as Smith) and Suicide Squad. In the 2017 film Spider-Man: Homecoming, he plays a grandson of his Captain America character.

Choi has appeared in television. He played Henry Lin in Sons of Anarchy, Captain Ed Rollins on the NBC TV series Ironside, and Sam Luttrell for the NBC TV series Allegiance.

Choi played Judge Lance Ito in The People v. O. J. Simpson: American Crime Story. He appeared in various TV series, including Longmire, The Newsroom, The Last Man on Earth, Glee, Heroes, 24, Lincoln Heights, CSI: Crime Scene Investigation, House M.D. and The King of Queens.

Choi has provided his voice as Jim Morita for the video game Captain America: Super Soldier. He has voiced the role of a gangster in the 2004 video game Grand Theft Auto: San Andreas.

In October 2017, Choi was cast as Howie "Chimney" Han on Fox TV's show 9-1-1. In 2018, Choi played Bob Dwyer on Starz's Counterpart. Also that year, he appeared in the feature films Gringo, and Hotel Artemis.

Filmography

Film

Television

Video games

Music videos

References

External links
 

American male actors of Korean descent
Male actors from Chicago
21st-century American male actors
American male film actors
American male television actors
Living people
American male voice actors
20th-century American male actors
1971 births
Krannert School of Management alumni
Homewood-Flossmoor High School alumni